The following is a list of notable Chitrali, Kalasha and Palula-speaking Chitrali people.

Historical personalities
 His Highness Shuja Ul Mulk

Politics
 Shahzada Mohiuddin
 Shahzada Iftikhar nddin

References

History of Chitral
Chitrali
Chitrali